"Never Knew Love" is a song by American singer and songwriter Oleta Adams, released in 1995 as the lead single from her fifth album, Moving On (1995). It was the most successful single of three tracks released from the LP, and became Adams' fourth Top 40 single to chart in the UK and second greatest hit, peaking at number 22. The single did best in the Netherlands, where it reached number 16, corresponding with the greater success of her LP on the Dutch charts. Multiple remixes have been released of the track.

Critical reception 
Larry Flick from Billboard viewed the album version of "Never Knew Love" as a "funky li'l midtempo R&B jam." He added, "Underlined with plush old-school charm, this track has considerable youth appeal. Adams has rarely sounded so playful. (...) In all, a solid single designed to expand Adams' already sizable audience." Flick also noted that remixers Danny Tenaglia and Satoshi Tomiie transform the song into "a shimmering house anthem". James Masterton for Dotmusic described it as a "powerful track". 

Pan-European magazine Music & Media wrote about the remix, "Known as a rather MOR singer, Adams now confidently nods into a NY club house sound and shamelessly takes a seat between Robin S and the Nightcrawlers. Hot stuff!" In another review, they added, "With an intro reminiscent of Crystal Waters' "Gypsy Woman", Adams shines in a upbeat and happy electro-pop single." Alan Jones from Music Week felt the singer "bounces back with her best single in a while", with "a delightful celebration, whose infectious style is wholly appropriate to its upbeat lyrics. Dance mixes take it higher still and the whole exercise makes for happy anticipation of her forthcoming album Moving On." James Hamilton from the RM Dance Update declared it as a "gorgeous catchily cooed and moaned soulful gentle sure-fire smash".

Track listing 
 12", UK (1995)
"Never Knew Love" (DT's Mercury Mix) – 8:40
"Never Knew Love" (You Gave Me Dub) – 8:19
"Never Knew Love" (DT's Radio Edit) – 4:05
"Never Knew Love" (The Press Remix) – 3:50
"Never Knew Love" (Reverend Jefferson Mix) – 7:10
"Never Knew Love" (Nu Soul Mix) – 6:57

 CD single, Europe (1995)
"Never Knew Love" (Reverend Jefferson Edit) – 4:06
"Never Knew Love" – 3:22

 CD single, UK & Europe (1995)
"Never Knew Love" – 3:20
"No Secrets" – 4:08
"Blessed With You" – 3:24
"Get Here" – 4:34

Charts

References

External links
 

1994 songs
1995 singles
Fontana Records singles
Oleta Adams songs
Songs written by Kathy Wakefield
Songs written by Vassal Benford
Neo soul songs
Soul jazz songs